The 2016 MSA British Rally Championship was the 57th season of the British Rally Championship after a one-year absence.

The championship featured eight classes:

 BRC 1 (R5, R4, Super 2000, Regional Rally Car)
 BRC 2 (N4)
 BRC 3 (R3)
 BRC 4 (R2)
 BRC 5 (R1)
 BRC GT (Porsche 911 RGT)
 National Rally Cup (open class)
 Junior BRC (R2, drivers under 26 years old)

For the first time since 2011, the BRC had four-wheel drive classes.

Calendar

The 2016 championship was contested over seven rounds

Teams and Drivers
BRC1 Entries

BRC2 Entries

BRC3 Entries

BRC4 Entries

Junior BRC Entries

BRC5 Entries

Event results

Podium places and information on each event.

Drivers championship standings

Points will be awarded in each class as follows: 25, 15, 12, 10, 8, 6, 4, 2, 1. Competitors may nominate one event as their 'joker', on which they will score additional points. The final round of the championship was a double-header for points as the rally was split into two point scoring rounds.
Competitors six best scores will count towards their championship total, including the final round.

References

British Rally Championship seasons
Rally Championship
British Rally Championship